María del Rosario de Fátima Pariente Gavito (born 1 December 1955) is a Mexican politician affiliated with the PVEM. As of 2013 she served as Deputy of the LXII Legislature of the Mexican Congress representing Chiapas.

References

1955 births
Living people
Politicians from Chiapas
Women members of the Chamber of Deputies (Mexico)
Ecologist Green Party of Mexico politicians
21st-century Mexican politicians
21st-century Mexican women politicians
Members of the Congress of Chiapas
Deputies of the LXII Legislature of Mexico
Members of the Chamber of Deputies (Mexico) for Chiapas